The F48 BMW X1 is the second generation of the BMW X1 range of subcompact luxury crossover SUV. The F48 X1 was unveiled at the September 2015 Frankfurt Motor Show, and later at the 2015 Tokyo Motor Show. Contrary to the previous generation which uses rear-wheel drive as standard, all models are now front-wheel drive based (marketed as sDrive) while also available with an optional all-wheel drive (xDrive).

Development and launch 
The F48 X1 is based on the modular front-wheel-drive-based UKL2 platform that is shared between BMW and MINI models, instead of being based on the rear-wheel drive 3 Series Touring platform as with the previous generation X1.

In comparison, the F48 X1 has a  shorter wheelbase, and is  wider, and  taller compared to its predecessor. However, the new platform has allowed for increased interior legroom, headroom, and shoulder room.

A long-wheelbase model for the Chinese market (F49 model code) was unveiled at the 2016 Beijing Auto Show, and features a  longer wheelbase. Long-wheelbase models share the same engines and also introduced a new all-wheel drive hybrid model called the xDrive25Le. These models went on sale in May 2016.

The xDrive25i is marketed as the xDrive28i in North American markets.

LCI 
In May 2019, the facelifted LCI model was revealed on the official BMW website. Changes include new available LED headlights, bumpers (with LED taillights), new wheels, and a larger kidney grille reminiscent to other contemporary BMW models such as the F40 1 Series.

The BMW X1 xDrive25e plug-in hybrid version was revealed in September 2019.

Equipment 
All models get 17-inch alloy wheels, a roof rack, an electrically operated tailgate, a 6.5-inch iDrive system, cloth seats, and 40:20:40 split-folding rear seats. The X1 is also offered in a Sport trim which adds sports seats, and in xLine and M Sport trim which adds heated leather seats. Available options include a panoramic sunroof, an upgraded iDrive Navigation Plus system with an 8.8-inch touch display, and a head-up display.

sDrive16d and 18i models are available with a 6-speed manual transmission and sDrive18i models can be upgraded to a 6-speed Automatic Transmission for 2016 to 2017 and a 7-speed Steptronic dual clutch transmission (DCT) from 2018 onwards. The rest of the model range receives the 8-speed Steptronic automatic manufactured by Aisin (AWF8F35) as standard from 2016 to 2017, and sDrive20i models receive a Steptronic 7-speed DCT (similar to the 2018-up sDrive18i) from 2018 onwards, while the rest of the range still gets the same 8-speed Steptronic automatic.

In September 2019, BMW revealed the X1 xDrive25e plug-in hybrid model, which combines a 1.5-litre 3-cylinder petrol engine with a 9.7 kWh lithium-ion battery pack and a  electric motor. The petrol engine is paired with a 6-speed Steptronic automatic transmission.

Models

Petrol engines 

* xDrive25i model sold as xDrive28i in the United States, using the B46A20O0 version of the straight-4 engine. A front-wheel-drive ‘sDrive28i’ variant powered by the same engine is also offered.

Diesel engines

Safety 
The 2015 BMW X1 scored five stars overall in its Euro NCAP test.

Environmental performance 
In February 2019 Green NCAP assessed BMW X1 with 18d xDrive 4-cylinder diesel engine and manual transmission:

Production volumes 
The following are the production figures for the F48 X1:

Awards 
 2015 Auto Bild "Golden Steering Wheel"
 2016 Auto motor und sport "Best Cars 2016"
 2016 Auto motor und sport "Value Master 2016"
 2017 Motor Trend "Best Subcompact Luxury SUV"
 2018 Auto motor und sport "Best Cars 2018"

References

External links 
 Official website

X1
Compact sport utility vehicles
Luxury crossover sport utility vehicles
All-wheel-drive vehicles
Front-wheel-drive vehicles
Luxury sport utility vehicles
Euro NCAP small off-road
Cars introduced in 2015
Cars discontinued in 2022